Torrid Zone is a 1940 adventure film directed by William Keighley and starring James Cagney, Ann Sheridan, and Pat O'Brien. The supporting cast features Andy Devine and George Reeves.

Plot
Steve Case has to deal with trouble at his tropical fruit company's Central American banana plantation. A revolutionary, Rosario La Mata, is stirring up unrest among the workers, and the only man who can handle the situation, foreman Nick Butler, has just quit. Steve manages to persuade Nick to stick around (for a big bonus). Adding to the complications is Lee Donley, a woman whom Steve has ordered out of the region for causing a different kind of trouble among the men.

Cast
James Cagney as Nick Butler
Ann Sheridan as Lee Donley
Pat O'Brien as Steve Case
Andy Devine as Wally Davis
Helen Vinson as Mrs. Gloria Anderson
Jerome Cowan as Bob Anderson
George Tobias as Rosario La Mata
George Reeves as Sancho
Victor Kilian as Carlos
Frank Puglia as Police Chief Juan Rodriguez
 Frank Yaconelli as Lopez 
 Dick Botiller as Hernandez

References

External links

 
Screenland magazine's May 1940 issue has a short story based on the film.

1940 films
1940 adventure films
American adventure films
American black-and-white films
1940s English-language films
Films directed by William Keighley
Films scored by Adolph Deutsch
Films set in Central America
Warner Bros. films
1940s American films